The VAZ-2103 Zhiguli is a deluxe compact sedan car (small class, passenger car, model 3 in the Soviet classification), produced by VAZ, introduced in 1972 and produced until 1984. Better known by its export name Lada 1500 outside of its native Soviet Union and popularly nicknamed Тройка (Troika, 'three') in its domestic market. The car was developed jointly by VAZ and FIAT at the same time as Fiat 124 Special, and the two models had the same basis and influenced each other. 2103 was built under license and tailored for the Soviet and Eastern European market. The 2103 externally differs from its predecessor, the VAZ-2101 firstly by its four, that is, double sets of headlights, different grille and direction pointers, moldings on the sides of the body and larger taillights. Its main difference - the more powerful   straight-four petrol engine. In addition, this model is distinguished by the presence of vacuum brake booster as well as self-adjusting rear brakes and internally on new, Fiat 125 based, front panel along with its steering wheel and improved dashboard featuring wood imitation, tachometer, oil pressure gauge and front panel clock.

History
The car featured a starting handle for cranking the engine manually should the battery go flat in Siberian winter conditions, auxiliary fuel pump  as well as improved soundproofing.

VAZ were forbidden from selling the car in competing markets alongside the Fiat 124; however exports to Western European nations began in 1974 when the 124 was discontinued in favour of Fiat's newer 131 Mirafiori model. The VAZ-2103 was sold in export markets from mid-1970s to early 1980 essentially as a "de luxe" version of the VAZ-2101. In the United Kingdom, it was sold from May 1976 until May 1979 and it was the second Lada car to be sold in this market. Although starting to be slowly replaced with its successor, the VAZ-2106 already from 1976, it remained in production until 1984. It was the first VAZ model to be discontinued,  in spite of not being the oldest one. This was mainly due to the complexity of production and the expense of its chrome plated elements, both of which were severely reduced in VAZ-2106.

Reviewers from the French L'Auto-Journal called it "an extremely serious working instrument, able to operate in the worst conditions" and "a well-made car capable of being serviced anywhere, even by its owner".

Changes and models
 VAZ-2103  (1972-1984) — 4-door saloon was equipped with  straight-four. Compared to the Fiat 124 Special, modifications were done to suspension, carburetor, and some other parts in order to satisfy the wide range of Russian climate conditions. All of these models were adapted to local roads and had a suspension able to provide a comfortable ride even on tough gravel roads. This Lada was a hit in the Soviet Union. The more expensive VAZ-2103 was considered a prestigious model, and was very popular among Soviet white-collar workers. Unfortunately the Tolyatti plant where Lada were produced could not keep up with consumer demand and people had to wait for years to get chances to buy a car. The 21032 was the right-hand drive version.
 VAZ-21031 (1975) — small-scale production as the factory was ramping up for the VAZ-2106, engine   (VAZ-2106). No export.
 VAZ-21033 (1977-1983) — similar to VAZ-2103, engine  (VAZ-21011), exported as the Lada 1300S.
 VAZ-21035 (1973-1981) — similar to VAZ-2103, engine  (VAZ-2101), exported as the Lada 1200DL.
The estate version VAZ-2102 was also available equipped with engine VAZ-2103 (1.5 L) and panel also known as Lada 1500 Combi (VAZ-21023, 1500 DL Estate).

References

Compact cars
Cars of Russia
1970s cars
1980s cars
2103
Soviet automobiles
Italy–Soviet Union relations